Sanford is a town in Covington County, Alabama, United States. At the 2020 census, the population was 257. Sanford was originally incorporated in 1902 and was on the 1910 U.S. Census. It did not appear again on the census until 1960.

Geography
Sanford is located near the center of Covington County at  (31.300683, -86.391734), between the cities of Andalusia and Opp.

Demographics

As of the census of 2000, there were 269 people, 112 households, and 77 families residing in the town. The racial makeup of the town was 97.77% White, 0.74% Native American, and 1.49% from two or more races. 1.86% of the population were Hispanic or Latino of any race.

There were 112 households, out of which 36.6% had children under the age of 18 living with them, 58.0% were married couples living together, 5.4% had a female householder with no husband present, and 30.4% were non-families. 26.8% of all households were made up of individuals, and 12.5% had someone living alone who was 65 years of age or older. The average household size was 2.40 and the average family size was 2.95.

In the town, the population was spread out, with 24.9% under the age of 18, 8.2% from 18 to 24, 30.1% from 25 to 44, 21.6% from 45 to 64, and 15.2% who were 65 years of age or older. The median age was 39 years. For every 100 females, there were 110.2 males. For every 100 females age 18 and over, there were 106.1 males.

The median income for a household in the town was $20,139, and the median income for a family was $25,313. Males had a median income of $19,844 versus $13,333 for females. The per capita income for the town was $10,558. About 19.1% of families and 19.1% of the population were below the poverty line, including 20.8% of those under the age of eighteen and 11.6% of those 65 or over.

References 

Towns in Covington County, Alabama
Towns in Alabama